Poimenesperus laetus is a species of beetle in the family Cerambycidae. It was described by James Thomson in 1858. It is known from the Democratic Republic of the Congo, Cameroon, and Gabon.

References

laetus
Beetles described in 1858